Stefan Lukas Hierländer (born 3 February 1991) is an Austrian professional footballer who plays as a midfielder for Austrian Bundesliga club Sturm Graz and the Austria national team.

Career

Club
He started his football  career in his local club SV Greifenburg and played 2002  till 2007 for SV Spittal/Drau. From 2008 until 2010 he played for Austrian Football Bundesliga side SK Austria Kärnten. His first match in the first squad was on  March, 18th 2009 versus SK Sturm Graz. He entered in minute 57 for Manuel Weber. Because Kärnten got no license for the season 2010/11 Hierländer signed a contract with FC Red Bull Salzburg.

On 31 May 2014, he signed a two-year contract with RB Leipzig.

On 9 May 2018 he scored the only goal as Sturm Graz best Red Bull Salzburg in extra time to win the 2017/18 Austrian Cup.

International
Hierländer got his first call up to the senior Austria side after Guido Burgstaller withdrew through injury for 2018 FIFA World Cup qualifiers against Wales and Georgia in September 2017. He finally made a debut in the national team on 27 March 2018 in a 4–0 win against Luxembourg.

Career statistics

Honours
Austrian Football Bundesliga (2):
 2012, 2014 with Red Bull Salzburg
Austrian Cup (2):
 2012, 2014 with Red Bull Salzburg
2018 with Sturm Graz

References

External links
Players profile on Red Bull Homepage

 
 OFB Profile

1991 births
Living people
Austrian footballers
Austria international footballers
Austria youth international footballers
Austria under-21 international footballers
Association football midfielders
SK Austria Kärnten players
FC Red Bull Salzburg players
RB Leipzig players
SK Sturm Graz players
Austrian Football Bundesliga players
2. Bundesliga players
Regionalliga players
Austrian expatriate footballers
Expatriate footballers in Germany
Austrian expatriate sportspeople in Germany
People from Villach
Footballers from Carinthia (state)